Tanner Vili (born 13 May 1976) is a New Zealand/Samoan rugby union footballer. He plays as a fly-half and full back

He played for Samoa at the 1999 Rugby World Cup and  2003 Rugby World Cup.

References

Living people
1976 births
Border Reivers players
Samoa international rugby union players
Pacific Islanders rugby union players
New Zealand rugby union players
Rugby union players from Wellington City
New Zealand sportspeople of Samoan descent
Samoan expatriate rugby union players
Expatriate rugby union players in Scotland
Expatriate rugby union players in Japan
New Zealand expatriate rugby union players
Samoan expatriate sportspeople in Japan
Samoan expatriate sportspeople in Scotland
New Zealand expatriate sportspeople in Japan
New Zealand expatriate sportspeople in Scotland
Rugby union fly-halves